Paul Schoeffler (born November 21, 1958) is a Canadian stage, film, television, and voice actor.

Biography
Schoeffler provides the voices for many characters on the Cartoon Network animated series Courage the Cowardly Dog. He has also made guest appearances on Midnight Caller and Law & Order.

He has also acted on stages such as Philadelphia's Walnut Street Theatre, portraying characters such as Don Quixote from Man of La Mancha, Javert from Les Misérables, and Captain Hook from Peter Pan; and Sweet Charity among others.  He originated the role of the German developer, Hertz, in the Broadway cast of Rock Of Ages and returned to the role on October 26, 2009, following a 3-month absence where he played Lawrence Jameson in the Walnut Street Theatre production of Dirty Rotten Scoundrels The Musical.

Filmography

Film

Television

Videogames

References

External links

1958 births
Living people
Canadian male voice actors
Canadian male film actors
Canadian male television actors
Canadian male stage actors
American male voice actors
American male film actors
American male television actors
American male stage actors
Male actors from Montreal